The Dartford and Gravesham NHS Trust is an NHS Trust with an annual budget of about £121 million, and employs 1,900 staff. It manages Darent Valley Hospital in Dartford, Queen Mary's Hospital in Sidcup, Erith and District Hospital and Elm Court.

History
A proposed merger with Medway NHS Foundation Trust was called off in September 2013.

Performance

It was named by the Health Service Journal as one of the top hundred NHS trusts to work for in 2015.  At that time it had 2593 full-time equivalent staff and a sickness absence rate of 3.68%. 78% of staff recommend it as a place for treatment and 76% recommended it as a place to work.

Darent Valley Hospital had the highest rate and number of MRSA cases for NHS trusts in England in 2015. There were 14 cases of patients being infected between 1 April 2015 and 29 February 2016.

In 2018 it forecast a deficit, for the fourth year in a row. It expected to make a loss of deficit of £20.4 million in 2018/9.

It signed a five year contract with  Medirest in 2021 for catering, cleaning and security services, with 300 staff members transferring to the group. The company provides a robot used for the cleaning of the main corridors.  There have been complaints that the contractor has cut supplies down "to the absolute basics" so it is difficult to get hand towels to fill the dispensers, bags to fill the bins or soap to fill the dispensers. The company denies this. It also says it has introduced free meals for all employees at Darent Valley who are able to access packed lunches.

See also
 Healthcare in Kent
 List of NHS trusts

References

Borough of Dartford
NHS hospital trusts